Benjamin Strong Baumer (born 1978) is a  statistician and sabermetrician. He is an assistant professor of statistical and data sciences at Smith College, and was formerly the statistical analyst for the New York Mets.

Life
Baumer grew up in Northampton, Massachusetts. His parents are Polly Baumer and Don Baumer, a former magazine owner and professor of government at Smith College.

Baumer received a Bachelor of Arts in economics from Wesleyan University, and his masters in applied mathematics from the University of California, San Diego. He completed a PhD at the City University of New York.

Baumer is married to Cory Mescon, a public defender.

Work
Baumer is known for his work in sabermetrics, including the book The Sabermetric Revolution: Assessing the Growth of Analytics in Baseball with Andrew Zimbalist. He was the statistical analyst for the New York Mets for eight years, between 2004-2012. This was shortly after the publication of Moneyball, so the use of statistical analysis in baseball was still a new field.

Since leaving the Mets, Baumer has been a professor at Smith College. Upon arrival at Smith, he taught in the mathematics department. He was instrumental in the development of Smith's program in statistical and data sciences, and is now appointed in that program. The program is one of the first undergraduate majors in data science in the United States, and the first at a women's college. Baumer is also a member of the advisory board for the MassMutual data science initiative, a joint effort with Smith College, Mount Holyoke College, and MassMutual.

Baumer has written a textbook for use in data science courses, Modern Data Science with R. He has several highly cited papers on pedagogical techniques for undergraduate data science education. He has taught online data science courses for DataCamp. He is a member of the national organizing committee for DataFest, a weekend-long data hackathon for undergraduate students. Baumer has also organized the FiveCollege Data Fest since 2014.

He is the author of several R packages, including openWAR, a package for analyzing baseball data, and etl, a package for Extract, Transform, Load operations on medium data.

Awards
Baumer received the 2016 Contemporary Baseball Analysis Award. His project, The Great Analytics Rankings, was nominated for a 2015 EPPY award.

Bibliography

 .
 .
 .

References

1978 births
Date of birth missing (living people)
Living people
People from Northampton, Massachusetts
Wesleyan University alumni
University of California, San Diego alumni
Graduate Center, CUNY alumni
American statisticians
Baseball statisticians
Data scientists
R (programming language) people
New York Mets personnel
Smith College faculty